Luca Princiotta (born 12 July 1982, in Como) is an Italian guitarist. He began his career playing in the thrash metal band Deathector between 1996 and 1998, before joining the Iron Maiden tribute band Clairvoyants. His most prominent role to date has been in Blaze (the band of former Maiden frontman Blaze Bayley) as a replacement for their departed founding guitarist Steve Wray. Originally employed as a tour musician, he was eventually hired on a permanent basis; he contributed to the songwriting of the band's upcoming album before departing in January 2007.

In June 2006 he was hired by the German heavy metal singer Doro to replace the band's guitarist (and his then Blaze bandmate) Oliver Palotai in some European gigs. From 2008, he became a stable member.

References

External links
 Official website
 Blaze Official website

Italian heavy metal guitarists
Italian male guitarists
1982 births
Living people
People from Como
21st-century guitarists
21st-century Italian male musicians